Kekovich is a surname. Notable people with the surname include:

 Brian Kekovich (born 1946), Australian rules footballer
 Sam Kekovich (born 1950), Australian rules footballer, commentator, and media personality